The Premier League of Belize is the highest competitive football league in Belize. It was founded on 28 December 2011 after the merger between the Belize Premier Football League and the Super League of Belize.

History

The formation of the league was a combination of Belize’s suspension by FIFA and the Belize Premier Football League withdrawing from the Football Federation of Belize. It was decided that a brand new top league was to be formed, the winner of which would represent Belize in the CONCACAF Champions League.

Due to the uncertainty of the COVID-19 pandemic, the 2019–20 Premier League of Belize closing season was cancelled after the eighth round of games and a winner was not crowned.

The Premier League of Belize (PLB) was suspended from administering the 2021–22 season by the Football Federation of Belize (FFB). The FFB administered the highest competitive football league in the country for this season, and sanctioned the 2021–22 FFB Top League. The PLB returned for the 2022–23 season.

Officials
On 6 January 2012 the current President of the League was announced as Jaime O. Perdomo, Jr, the Vice-President as Al Westby and the members being Celso Carcamo, Wilhelm Miguel and Onan McLean.

After election problems had left the league inactive for the whole of the 2021–22 season, on 2 June 2022 the league elected a new Executive in preparation for the 2022–23 season. Ian Haylock was elected as President, with Godfrey Arzu as Vice-President. Also elected were Karol Маldоnаdо Сlаrо, as Fеmаlе Ехесutіvе Меmbеr and Lorin Frazer and Јоrdаn Zаbаnеh, as Executive Members.

Current Teams (2022–23 Closing Season)

League champions

Titles by team

Awards

Top scorers

 Includes playoff goals.

MVP (Regular Season)

Best Young Player

Best Coach

Top 5 all-time scorers

 Includes playoff goals.

References

External links
Belize - List of Champions, RSSSF.com

 
1
Bel